Malalignment of the nail plate is a congenital malalignment of the nail of the great toe, and is often misdiagnosed although it is a common condition.

See also
 Skin lesion

References

Conditions of the skin appendages